Humbang Hasundutan Regency is a regency in North Sumatra province of Indonesia. It includes part of the southwest shore of Lake Toba of North Sumatra, Indonesia. The regency covers an area of 2,502.71 km2, and it had a population of 171,687 at the 2010 Census and 197,751 at the 2020 Census. Its seat is the town of Dolok Sanggul. To the north is Samosir Regency and Pakpak Bharat Regency, to the east is North Tapanuli Regency, and to the west and south is Central Tapanuli Regency, and beyond the latter the Indian Ocean.

Administrative districts 
The regency is divided administratively into ten districts (kecamatan), tabulated below with their areas and their populations at the 2010 Census  and the 2020 Census. The table also includes the locations of the district administrative centres, the number of administrative villages (desa and kelurahan) in each district and its post code.

References 

Regencies of North Sumatra